Almost Heroes is a Canadian comedy television series that premiered on June 2, 2011 on Showcase, and ran for one season (eight episodes) before being discontinued by Showcase at the beginning of the 2011 fall season. The series is centered on the lives of two brothers, Pete and Terry, played by Ryan Belleville and Paul Campbell, running their late father's comic book store, "The Silver Salmon".  The series was created by brothers Jason Belleville and Ryan Belleville.  The series also stars well-known Canadian comedian Colin Mochrie.  Canadian comedian Fraser Young is one of the writers and story editors for the show.

Plot
After the death of their father, brothers Terry and Peter inherit his suburban comic book store. The older brother Terry, returning from dropping out of business school at Harvard, decides to stay and help manage the comic book store after learning that the store is deep in debt.

Cast and characters

Main cast 
Paul Campbell as Terry, a business student at Harvard who returns to his hometown to save his father's store
Ryan Belleville as Pete, Terry's dimwitted but well-meaning younger brother
Dave Hemstad as Dan, an owner of a neighboring sports store who bullies the brothers
Lauren Ash as Bernie, a childhood friend of the brothers with a crush on Terry
Meghan Heffern as Candi, Bernie's boss
Athena Karkanis as Rayna, employee of the landlord
Colin Mochrie as Boyd, a security guard at the strip mall

Recurring cast 
Josh Granovsky as Young Terry 
Alex Cardillo as Young Pete

Episodes

References

External links 

 
Poster for the show
 
canada.com article on the show
Globe and Mail article on the show
The Correctness article on the show
 

2010s Canadian sitcoms
2011 Canadian television series debuts
2011 Canadian television series endings
Showcase (Canadian TV channel) original programming
Television shows set in Canada
English-language television shows
Television series by Corus Entertainment
Television series by Entertainment One
Television series set in shops
Television shows about comics